Market development funds or MDF are used in an indirect sales channel where funds are made available by a manufacturer or brand to help affiliates, channel partners, resellers, VARs, or distributors, etc. sell its products and create local awareness about the national brand. Co-op Funds is a synonym for Market Development Funds.

There are approximately 4,500 Co-op programs in the US made up of 50 product classifications on which some 50 billion dollars is spent each year. Slightly over half of that 50 billion dollars offered to partners each year by Brands goes unused because of uninformed partners implementation issues.

Developing an MDF Strategy 
While developing the MDF strategy, clarity of objective is critical for the MDF program designer. Generally, as a best practice, program designers should ask the following questions while defining the program:
 Why - Why are we deploying these MDF funds?
 Who - Who will these MDF funded promotions target?
 When - What should be the timing for this targeting?
 Where - What is the geographic location or category of prospect targeting?
 How - How can the MDF funds be used for maximum impact?
 What - What will you exactly do with the funds?
 Result - What specific result are you expecting from the program?

Funding Structures
MDFs are structured in different ways depending on the brands relationship with its affiliates (Open vs. Closed networks), the destination of Co-op Funds (for direct mail, email marketing, local PPC, etc.), and segment of affiliates the brand is trying to motivate or reward (top-performers, average-performers, low-performers). The way Co-op money is structured is important as it affects affiliates' willingness to participate in the brand's proposed marketing programs. Below are four common funding structures.

Stipend - This structure gives affiliates the freedom to use a fixed quantity of money ($300 per month for example) to opt into marketing programs that the brand makes available. Although affiliates have the option to choose among a range of programs, brands tend to highlight the programs in which they want affiliates to participate giving them prominence on the main interface of the MDF brands and affiliates use to collaborate.

Fixed Quantity - Sometimes brands, instead of giving a dollar amount, provide access to a fixed number of items (ex. direct mail pieces) or resources of a program (ex. local PPC) at no cost. The zero cost is aimed at motivating local affiliates with strong brand support.

Discount - Brands partially subsidize the local marketing spend of their affiliates with discounted, but not free, marketing programs. Brands try to convince affiliates that will subsidized marketing ROI on their marketing spend will be positive.

Rebate - Some Brands reimburse their local partners for money spent on approved advertising. This approach is often not recommended because Brands have a hard time motivating affiliates to spend their money first and try to recoup it later through cumbersome reimbursement logistics.

References 

Distribution (marketing)